Fantastic Four is the name of several comic book titles featuring the team Fantastic Four (created by Stan Lee and Jack Kirby) and published by Marvel Comics, beginning with the original Fantastic Four comic book series which debuted in 1961.

As the first superhero team title produced by Marvel Comics, it formed a cornerstone of the company's 1960s rise from a small division of a publishing company to a pop culture conglomerate. The title would go on to showcase the talents of comics creators such as Roy Thomas, John Buscema, John Byrne, Steve Englehart, Walt Simonson, Tom DeFalco, Mark Waid, and Jonathan Hickman. The Fantastic Four is one of several Marvel titles originating in the Silver Age of Comic Books that was continuously published through 2015 before returning to monthly publication in 2018.

Publication history
Magazine and comic book publisher Martin Goodman, a publishing trend-follower, aware of strong sales on Justice League of America, directed his comics editor, Stan Lee, to create a comic-book series about a team of superheroes. According to Lee, writing in 1974, "Martin mentioned that he had noticed one of the titles published by National Comics seemed to be selling better than most. It was a book called The  Justice League of America and it was composed of a team of superheroes. ... 'If the Justice League is selling', spoke he, 'why don't we put out a comic book that features a team of superheroes?'"

1961–1970s
The release of The Fantastic Four #1 (Nov. 1961) was an unexpected success. Lee had felt ready to leave the comics field at the time, but the positive response to Fantastic Four persuaded him to stay on. The title began to receive fan mail and Lee started printing the letters in a letter column with issue #3. With the third issue, Lee created the hyperbolic slogan "The Greatest Comic Magazine in the World!!" The following issue, the slogan was changed to "The World's Greatest Comic Magazine!" and became a fixture on the issue covers into the 1990s, and on numerous covers in the 2000s.

Issue #4 (May 1962) reintroduced Namor the Sub-Mariner, an aquatic antihero who was a star character of Marvel's earliest iteration, Timely Comics, during the late 1930s and 1940s period that historians and fans call the Golden Age of Comics. Issue #5 (July 1962) introduced the team's most frequent nemesis, Doctor Doom. These earliest issues were published bimonthly. With issue #16 (July 1963), the cover title dropped its The and became simply Fantastic Four.

Kirby left Marvel in mid-1970, having drawn the first 102 issues plus an unfinished issue, partially published in Fantastic Four #108, with alterations, and later completed and published as Fantastic Four: The Lost Adventure (April 2008), Fantastic Four continued with Lee, Roy Thomas, Gerry Conway and Marv Wolfman as its consecutive regular writers, working with artists such as John Romita Sr., John Buscema, Rich Buckler and George Pérez, with longtime inker Joe Sinnott adding some visual continuity. Jim Steranko also contributed several covers during this time. A short-lived series titled Giant-Size Super-Stars starring the team began in May 1974 and changed its title to Giant-Size Fantastic Four with issue #2. John Byrne joined the title with issue #209 (Aug. 1979), doing pencil breakdowns for Sinnott to finish.

1980s and 1990s
Bill Mantlo briefly followed Wolfman as writer of the series and wrote a crossover with Peter Parker, The Spectacular Spider-Man #42 (May 1980). Byrne wrote and drew a giant-sized Fantastic Four promotional comic for Coca-Cola, which was rejected by Coca-Cola as being too violent and published as Fantastic Four #220-221 (July–Aug. 1980) instead. Writer Doug Moench and penciller Bill Sienkiewicz then took over for 10 issues. With issue #232 (July 1981), the aptly titled "Back to the Basics", Byrne began his run as writer, penciller and inker, the last under the pseudonym Bjorn Heyn for this issue only.

Byrne revitalized the slumping title with his run. Originally, Byrne was slated to write with Sienkiewicz providing the art. Sienkiewicz left to do Moon Knight, and Byrne ended up as writer, artist, and inker. Various editors were assigned to the comic; eventually Bob Budiansky became the regular editor. Byrne told Jim Shooter that he could not work with Budiansky, although they ultimately continued to work together. In 2006, Byrne said "that's my paranoia. I look back and I think that was Shooter trying to force me off the book". Byrne left following issue #293 (Aug. 1986) in the middle of a story arc, explaining he could not recapture the fun he had previously had on the series.

Byrne was followed by a quick succession of writers: Roger Stern, Tom DeFalco, and Roy Thomas. Steve Englehart took over as writer for issues 304–332 (except #320). The title had been struggling, so Englehart decided to make radical changes. He felt the title had become stale with the normal makeup of Reed, Sue, Ben, and Johnny, so in issue #308 Reed and Sue retired and were replaced with the Thing's new girlfriend, Sharon Ventura, and Johnny Storm's former love, Crystal. The changes increased readership through issue #321. At this point, Marvel made decisions about another Englehart comic, West Coast Avengers, that he disagreed with, and in protest he changed his byline to S.F.X. Englehart (S.F.X. is the abbreviation for Simple Sound Effects). In issue #326, Englehart was told to bring Reed and Sue back and undo the other changes he had made. This caused Englehart to take his name entirely off the book. He used the pseudonym John Harkness, which he had created years before for work he did not want to be associated with. According to Englehart, the run from #326 through his last issue, #332, was "one of the most painful stretches of [his] career." Writer-artist Walt Simonson took over as writer with #334 (December 1989), and three issues later began pencilling and inking as well. With brief inking exceptions, two fill-in issues, and a three-issue stint drawn by Arthur Adams, Simonson remained in all three positions through #354 (July 1991).

Simonson, who had been writing the team comic The Avengers, had gotten approval for Reed and Sue to join that team after Engelhart had written them out of Fantastic Four. Yet by The Avengers #300, where they were scheduled to join the team, Simonson was told the characters were returning to Fantastic Four. This led to Simonson quitting The Avengers after that issue. Shortly afterward, he was offered the job of writing Fantastic Four. Having already prepared a number of stories involving the Avengers with Reed and Sue in the lineup, he then rewrote these for Fantastic Four. Simonson later recalled that working on Fantastic Four allowed him the latitude to use original Avengers members Thor and Iron Man, which he had been precluded from using in The Avengers.

After another fill-in, the regular team of writer and Marvel editor-in-chief Tom DeFalco, penciller Paul Ryan and inker Dan Bulanadi took over, with Ryan self-inking beginning with #360 (Jan. 1992). That team, with the very occasional different inker, continued for years through #414 (July 1996). DeFalco nullified the Storm-Masters marriage by retconning that the alien Skrull Empire had kidnapped the real Masters and replaced her with a spy named Lyja. Once discovered, Lyja, who herself had fallen for Storm, helped the Fantastic Four rescue Masters. Ventura departed after being further mutated by Doctor Doom. Although some fans were not pleased with DeFalco's run on Fantastic Four, calling him "The Great Satan", the title's sales increased over the period.

The ongoing series was cancelled with issue #416 (Sept. 1996) and relaunched with (vol. 2) #1 (Nov. 1996) as part of the multi-series "Heroes Reborn" crossover story arc. The yearlong volume retold the team's first adventures in a more contemporary style, and set in a parallel universe. Following the end of that experiment, Fantastic Four was relaunched with (vol. 3) #1 (Jan. 1998). Initially by the team of writer Scott Lobdell and penciller Alan Davis, it went after three issues to writer Chris Claremont (co-writing with Lobdell for #4-5), penciller Salvador Larroca, and inker Art Thibert; this team enjoyed a long run through issue #32 (Aug. 2000).

2000s
Following the run of Claremont, Lobdell and Larroca, Carlos Pacheco took over as penciller and co-writer, first with Rafael Marín, then with Marín and Jeph Loeb. This series began using dual numbering, as if the original Fantastic Four series had continued unbroken, with issue #42 / #471 (June 2001). At the time, the Marvel Comics series begun in the 1960s, such as Thor and The Amazing Spider-Man, were given such dual numbering on the front cover, with the present-day volume's numbering alongside the numbering from the original series. After issue #70 / #499 (Aug. 2003), the title reverted to its original vol. 1 numbering with issue #500 (Sept. 2003).

Karl Kesel succeeded Loeb as co-writer with issue #51 / #480 (March 2002), and after a few issues with temporary teams, Mark Waid took over as writer with #60 / 489 (October 2002) with artist Mike Wieringo with Marvel releasing a promotional variant edition of their otherwise $2.25 debut issue at the price of nine cents US. Pencillers Mark Buckingham, Casey Jones, and Howard Porter variously contributed through issue #524 (May 2005), with a handful of issues by other teams also during this time. Writer J. Michael Straczynski and penciller Mike McKone did issues #527-541 (July 2005 - Nov. 2006), with Dwayne McDuffie taking over as writer the following issue, and Paul Pelletier succeeding McKone beginning with #544 (May 2007).

As a result of the events of the "Civil War" company-crossover storyline, the Black Panther and Storm temporarily replaced Reed and Susan Richards on the team. During that period, the Fantastic Four also appeared in Black Panther, written by Reginald Hudlin and pencilled primarily by Francis Portela. Beginning with issue #554 (April 2008), writer Mark Millar and penciller Bryan Hitch began what Marvel announced as a sixteen-issue run. Following the summer 2008 crossover storyline, "Secret Invasion", and the 2009 aftermath "Dark Reign", chronicling the U.S. government's assigning of the Nation's security functions to the seemingly reformed supervillain Norman Osborn, the Fantastic Four starred in a five-issue miniseries, Dark Reign: Fantastic Four (May–Sept. 2009), written by Jonathan Hickman, with art by Sean Chen. Hickman took over as the series regular writer as of issue #570 with Dale Eaglesham and later Steve Epting on art.

2010s
In the storyline "Three", which concluded in Fantastic Four #587 (cover date March 2011, published January 26, 2011), the Human Torch appears to die while stopping a horde of monsters from the other-dimensional Negative Zone. The series ended with the following issue, #588, and relaunched in March 2011 as simply FF. The relaunch saw the team assume a new name, the Future Foundation, adopt new black-and-white costumes, and accept longtime ally Spider-Man as a member. In October 2011, with the publication of FF #11 (cover-dated Dec. 2011), the Fantastic Four series reached its 599th issue.

In November 2011, to commemorate the 50th anniversary of the Fantastic Four and of Marvel Comics, the company published the 100-page Fantastic Four #600 (cover-dated Jan. 2012), which returned the title to its original numbering and featured the return of the Human Torch. It revealed the fate of the character of Johnny Storm after issue #587, showing that while he did in fact die, he was resurrected to fight as a gladiator for the entertainment of Annihilus. Storm later formed a resistance force called Light Brigade and defeated Annihilus.

As part of Marvel NOW! Fantastic Four ended with #611, ending Jonathan Hickman's long run on FF titles, and the title was relaunched in November 2012 with the creative team of writer Matt Fraction and artist Mark Bagley. In the new title with its numbering starting at #1, the entire Fantastic Four family explore space together, with the hidden intent for Reed Richards to discover why his powers are fading.

Writer James Robinson and artist Leonard Kirk launched a new Fantastic Four series in February 2014 (cover dated April 2014).

Robinson later confirmed that Fantastic Four would be cancelled in 2015 with issue #645, saying that "The book is reverting to its original numbers, and the book is going away for a while. I'm moving towards the end of Fantastic Four. I just want to reassure people that you will not leave this book with a bad taste in your mouth." In the aftermath of the "Secret Wars" storyline, the Thing is working with the Guardians of the Galaxy and the Human Torch is acting as an ambassador with the Inhumans. With Franklin's powers restored and Reed having absorbed the power of the Beyonders from Doom, the Richards' family are working on travelling through and reconstructing the multiverse, but Peter Parker has purchased the Baxter Building to keep it "safe" until the team is ready to come back together.

Writer Dan Slott and artist Sara Pichelli launched a new Fantastic Four series in August 2018 to commemorate the 56th anniversary and part of Marvel's "Fresh Start" relaunch. The new series returned the Invisible Woman , Mister Fantastic, Valeria and Franklin Richards to the Earth 616 for the first time since Secret Wars.

2020s
A new volume of Fantastic Four was launched in November 2022 by writer Ryan North and artist Iban Coello, after Slott had concluded his run with issue #46.

Cultural impact
The first issue of The Fantastic Four proved a success, igniting a new direction for superhero comics and soon influencing many other superhero comics. Readers grew fond of Ben's grumpiness, Johnny's tendency to annoy others and Reed and Sue's spats. Stan Lee was surprised at the reaction to the first issue, leading him to stay in the comics field despite previous plans to leave. Comics historian Stephen Krensky said that "Lee's natural dialogue and flawed characters appealed to 1960s kids looking to 'get real'".

As of 2005, 150 million comics featuring the Fantastic Four had been sold.

Collected editions
The Fantastic Four stories have been collected into several trade paperback and hardcover editions.

As part of the Essential Marvel range:

As part of the Marvel Masterworks series:

Fantastic Four Volume 1

Fantastic Four Volume 2

Fantastic Four Volume 3
The issue numbering of Volume 3 reverted to the legacy number of the title, beginning with the issue #500.

Fantastic Four Volume 4

Fantastic Four Volume 5
The issue numbering of Volume 5 reverted to the overall legacy number of the title.

Fantastic Four Volume 6

Fantastic Four Volume 7

Marvel Knights Fantastic Four

Other paperbacks

Epic Collections

Hardcovers

International publication

North America

The Fantastic Four has been published in translation around the world, beginning in 1962 in Mexico as Los Cuatro Fantásticos published by La Prensa until the mid-1970s, then by Macc Division until 1980 and finally by Novedades Editores from 1980 to 1982 and French-speaking Canada as Les Fantastic Four, from 1969 to 1986, after which the title was merged with the Spider-Man title for three more years. Mexican translators were not consistent in their translations of the characters' code names; The Thing was called Coloso (Colossus) in the first series, La Mole in the second and the third (which was the name used for The Hulk in the first series). The other three main characters had more stable translated names: Mister Fantástico (sometimes translated as Señor Fantástico), La Chica (or La Mujer) Invisible, and La Antorcha Humana. Dr. Doom was Doctor Destino and She-Hulk was La Mujer Hulk in her run in the Fantastic Four. In the movie, and in current appearances in Mexico, Mister Fantastic is referred to as "El Hombre Elástico" (Elastic Man). Canada rarely translated character names from their English version, although sometimes switching back and forth between English and French names in the same issue (The Thing / La Chose, Mister Fantastic / Monsieur Fantastic, Invisible Girl / Fille (or Femme) Invisible, Human Torch / Torche Humaine). The names of Dr. Doom and She-Hulk were not translated into French for the Canadian reprints.

United Kingdom
British publication of the series began in the black and white anthology title Mystic in the 1960s. In 1972, the Fantastic Four's adventures were published starting with issue 1 of the US comic in Mighty World of Marvel alongside Spider-Man and Hulk reprints when Marvel Comics began its imprint Marvel UK. In 1976 the feature was moved to Marvel UK's The Titans to revive flagging sales, starting with issue #27. But after just a few months the feature was removed from The Titans (replaced by The Avengers) to form part of the line up of the new Captain Britain Weekly for its first issue in October 1976. After the demise of Captain Britain Weekly the FF went with Captain Britain into the merged Super Spider-man and Captain Britain Weekly in July 1977. A few months after the merger a new title The Complete Fantastic Four was launched in September 1977 starting with the story from the US Fantastic Four #133. Unusually The Complete Fantastic Four reprinted an entire issue of the US publication at a time when stories were always broken up into several installments. As a backup strip it started serializing the FF's adventures from US Fantastic Four 1, but this was replaced by The Invaders towards the end of the run. In 1978 that series merged into Mighty World Of Marvel returning the FF to their original home alongside the Hulk. Their last adventure in that title was issue 329, when they were moved out so that the comic could be relaunched as Marvel Comic in early 1979. Their adventures briefly moved back into Spider-Man Comic before stopping shortly after John Byrne took over pencilling chores on the strip. In March 1980 Marvel UK launched the Fantastic Four Pocketbook reprinting Lee and Kirby stories.

From 1 April 1981, the Fantastic Four featured in 15 issues of the anthology title Marvel Action. The FF strip then transferred to Marvel UK's weekly Captain America title from issue 21, which kept the Captain America numbering but temporarily adopting a new title Marvel Action starring Captain America. The FF strip was dropped when Captain America was merged with another Marvel UK weekly anthology title, Marvel Super Adventure, from issue 37.

After cancellation of the Pocketbook in July 1982 the classic FF strips continued in the short lived Fantastic Four weekly title that ran from 6 October 1982 for a total of 29 issues. During 1985 the Fantastic Four and other Marvel titles such as The New Mutants, The Avengers, and The X-Men were included in the Secret Wars II reprint title. This mostly focused on issues which crossed over into the Secret Wars II maxi series. From 2005, around the release of the Fantastic Four film, the super-team appeared in Fantastic Four Adventures, published by Panini Comics. The title ended in February 2010.

France

Publication history in France started with the reprinting of the first 10 pages of Fantastic Four #50 in 1967 in an anthology title called "Les Chefs-d'Oeuvres de la Bande Dessinée" [Comic Book Masterpieces]. In 1974, the first 4 issues of the title were published, one page at a time, in the daily newspaper "France Soir". But primarily, rights to the Fantastic Four in France were held by a company called Editions Lug, which began publishing Fantastic Four first in a 1969 anthology title called Fantask, along with Spider-Man and Silver Surfer, then in another anthology called "Marvel". The censors objected to the content of the book, and citing "nightmarish visions" and "terrifying science fiction" as the reasons, forced their cancellations after respectively 7 and 13 issues. Although other anthologies featuring Marvel strips continued, notably "Strange" (featuring the X-Men, Iron Man, and the Silver Surfer), the Fantastic Four remained unpublished in France until 1973. Editions Lug created a format aimed more for adults; an 80-page series called Une Aventure des Fantastiques debuted where the old series left off, with the stories that introduced the Inhumans and Galactus. That series lasted over 15 years, coming out four times a year. In the mid-1970s, a title called Spidey was released by Editions Lug. Primarily featuring reprints from the juvenile comic book Spidey Super Stories, it also featured a similarly themed FF series produced in France. These original stories had art that closely resembled the work of Jack Kirby or John Buscema, but the storylines themselves included watered-down super-villains, the FF on vacation and even Santa Claus. This series was replaced by 1960s era X-Men reprints when Marvel demanded the same royalties for Editions Lug's original stories that they did for the US reprints. Eventually, a regular monthly series began publication in France, and the Fantastic Four took over the headlining position in the pocket format anthology "Nova" (sharing the title with Spider-Woman, Peter Parker, She-Hulk, and Silver Surfer)and lasted until Marvel began publishing its own titles under the newly formed "Marvel France" line in the late 1990s. Fantastic Four shared space in the Silver Surfer's own book until the Heroes Reborn storyline created their own title, supported by Captain America. "Fantastic Four" then appeared in the anthology "Marvel Legends" and currently appears in "Marvel Icons", sharing that title with the Avengers.

Two different French companies held rights to Marvel Comics at the same time in the late 1970s and early 1980s. Editions Lug (which eventually changed its name to Semic Comics) published Fantastic Four, Spider-Man, X-Men, Daredevil, and Iron Man, and most related series, while Aredit held the rights to Avengers, Hulk, Thor, Captain America, Sub-Mariner and many of the 1970s-era modern series like Ghost Rider, Man-Thing, Power Man and the first She-Hulk series. Often, crossovers would force one company to publish another's title, i.e. the Marvel Two-In-One and Fantastic Four annuals that crossed over into the Invaders story would have to be published by the "other" company, and in fact that particular cross-over was published twice, once by each company. This resulted in different translations of the characters' names — Susan Storm Richards was called Jane in her own title by Editions Lug, and Reed was called Red, a combination of letters easier to pronounce than the double E sound. When Aredit published a Fantastic Four appearance they kept the traditional US names. Generally speaking, their names in France were: Monsieur Fantastic (although Mister was often used as well), L'Invisible, La Chose, and La Torche. (Rarely was "Humaine" used in the French editions.) Dr. Doom was called Docteur Fatalis and She-Hulk was called Miss Hulk.

Germany

"Die Fantastischen Vier" first appeared in Hit Comics, a weekly title that rotated the main feature with other Marvel titles. Williams Comics eventually obtained the rights to Marvel's line and began publishing (for the first time in color) in the mid-1970s. Fantastic Four was backed up with Daredevil and began with issue #1. No annual was published by Williams and some early numbers were left out (5, 6, 10, 12, 21 and 44). Condor Comic carried the title in the 1980s and 1990s, and published a series of 47 pocket format books at about 168-196 pages each. It also published a paperback series in a similar format to the Marvel Graphic Novels with 12 issues of 52 pages each. Marvel Deutschland (later Panini Comics Deutschland) publishes "Die Fantastischen Vier". Since 2008 the series is named with its original title "The Fantastic Four". The German names of the characters are Das Ding (The Thing), Die Fackel or Die menschliche Fackel (The Human Torch), Die Unsichtbare (The Invisible One), and Mr. Fantastisch (Mr. Fantastic). Silver Surfer and She-Hulk retained their English names. Some early Williams editions refer to Dr. Doom as "Doktor Unheil". In one Williams publication Dr.Doom is also referred to as "Doktor Untergang". Later they call him by his original US name.

Italy

Editoriale Corno initially published I Fantastici Quattro in Italy (first with Captain Marvel as backup feature, then rotating with other backup features). Star Comics published the title in the 1990s, followed by Marvel Italia. Character names are typically translated as "la Cosa" (Thing), "la Torcia Umana" (Human Torch) and "la Donna Invisibile" (Invisible Woman), while Dr. Doom is "Dottor Destino". Mister Fantastic, She-Hulk and Silver Surfer kept their English names. Also released in Italy was the series I Fantastici Quattro gigante, an oversized magazine reprinting in chronological order all the super-team's appearances including the Human Torch solo series from Strange Tales.

References

External links

 
 
  (UHBMCC gives 1998-2003 for vol. 3)
  (UHBMCC gives 2003-2011, starting with #500, for vol. 4)
 Fantastic Four at the Unofficial Handbook of Marvel Comics Creators (UHBMCC)

1961 comics debuts
Comics by Archie Goodwin (comics)
Comics by Doug Moench
Comics by George Pérez
Comics by Gerry Conway
Comics by J. Michael Straczynski
Comics by Jack Kirby
Comics by Jeph Loeb
Comics by Jim Lee
Comics by John Byrne (comics)
Comics by Jonathan Hickman
Comics by Len Wein
Comics by Mark Millar
Comics by Mark Waid
Comics by Marv Wolfman
Comics by Matt Fraction
Comics by Roger Stern
Comics by Roy Thomas
Comics by Stan Lee
Comics by Steve Englehart
Comics by Walt Simonson
Comics set in New York City
Marvel Comics titles